Yunus Erçelik (born May 19, 1980, in Beykoz, Istanbul, Turkey) is a Turkish professional motorcycle racer. He competes in the Turkish Superbike Championship.

He was born to parents who were motorcyclists. He is the second child of four siblings. He got interested in motorcycle riding through his father. He began racing after seeing his friends were not successful in competitions held at the İzmit Körfez Circuit. He had self-confidence he could do better. In 2007, he debuted in the Turkish Superstock 1000 B Championship and became the undefeated champion.

From 2008 to 2011, he won the championships and TMF Cup in the Superstock 1000 A category. In 2011, he raced for the team KMK on Honda CBR1000RR. Erçelik took part also at Alpe-Adria and East European Championships. In 2012, Erçelik ranked second in the Turkish championship. After five of seven rounds of the 2013 Turkish championship, he scored no points.

Gaining a wildcard, Erçelik raced at the 2013 Superbike World Championship's İstanbul Park round for his own Şampiyon 169 Team on BMW S1000RR. After starting at grid 14, Erçelik placed 14th in the Race 1 and 15th in the Race 2. He took 3 points in total.

Career statistics
2007
 Turkish Championship Superstock 1000 B - undefeated champion
 Balkan Open Road Racing Championship 6th Round SuperBike Serial 1000 – 2nd
2008
 Turkish Championship Superstock 1000 A - undefeated champion
 TMF Grand Prix - champion
 TMF Onur Cup - champion
2009
 Turkish Championship Superstock 1000 A - champion
2010
 TMF Grans Prix 1000A - champion
 Moto GP - champion
2011
 Turkish Championship Superstock 1000 A - champion
 TMF Cup 1000A - champion
 Moto GP - champion
2012
 Turkish Championship Superstock 1000 A - 2nd

Turkish Superstock 1000 Championship

 * Season still in progress

TMF Cup

Balkan Open Road Racing Championship

Superbike World Championship

References

External links
 Personal website

1980 births
People from Beykoz
Sportspeople from Istanbul
Living people
Turkish motorcycle racers
Superbike World Championship riders